The 2020 Sibiu Open was a professional tennis tournament played on clay courts. It was the ninth edition of the tournament which was part of the 2020 ATP Challenger Tour. It took place in Sibiu, Romania between 21 and 27 September 2020.

Singles main-draw entrants

Seeds

 1 Rankings are as of 14 September 2020.

Other entrants
The following players received wildcards into the singles main draw:
  Victor Vlad Cornea
  Dragoș Dima
  Nicholas David Ionel

The following player received entry into the singles main draw using a protected ranking:
  Íñigo Cervantes

The following player received entry into the singles main draw as an alternate:
  Felipe Meligeni Alves

The following players received entry from the qualifying draw:
  Elmar Ejupovic
  Carlos Gómez-Herrera
  Ergi Kırkın
  Matthieu Perchicot

Champions

Singles

 Marc-Andrea Hüsler def.  Tomás Martín Etcheverry 7–5, 6–0.

Doubles

 Hunter Reese /  Jan Zieliński def.  Robert Galloway /  Hans Hach Verdugo 6–4, 6–2.

References

2020 ATP Challenger Tour
2020
September 2020 sports events in Romania
September 2020 sports events in Europe
2020 in Romanian tennis